Harlan Edward Young (September 28, 1883 – March 26, 1975) nicknamed "Cy the Third", was a professional baseball pitcher. He played for two Major League Baseball teams in 1908, eight games for the Pittsburgh Pirates and six games for the Boston Doves.

External links

Major League Baseball pitchers
Pittsburgh Pirates players
Boston Doves players
Pittsburg Coal Diggers players
Pittsburg Miners players
Springfield Midgets players
Wichita Jobbers players
Jersey City Skeeters players
Oklahoma City Indians players
Topeka Jayhawks players
Sioux City Packers players
Seattle Giants players
Shreveport Gassers players
Victoria Islanders players
Petersburg Goobers players
Minor league baseball managers
Baseball players from Indiana
1883 births
1975 deaths
People from Portland, Indiana